William Thomas Walls Jr. (December 8, 1912 – January 3, 1993) was an American football player and coach.  He played professionally as an end for six seasons with the New York Giants of the National Football League (NFL). He attended North Little Rock High School in North Little Rock, Arkansas, and played college football at Texas Christian University.

References

External links
 
 Just Sports Stats
 

1912 births
1993 deaths
American football ends
Colorado Buffaloes football coaches
Corpus Christi Tarpons football coaches
Florida State Seminoles football coaches
LSU Tigers football coaches
New York Giants players
TCU Horned Frogs baseball players
TCU Horned Frogs football players
TCU Horned Frogs men's basketball players
High school football coaches in Texas
Junior college football coaches in the United States
People from Lonoke, Arkansas
People from North Little Rock, Arkansas
Players of American football from Arkansas